CRB Ain Turk (commonly known as CRB Ain Turk or simply CRBAT) is an Algerian Championnat National de Football Amateur football club based in Ain El Turk.

History
The club came eighth in the 2009–10 Ligue Inter-Régions de football – Groupe Ouest.

The club was promoted for the 2010–11 season of the newly created Championnat National de Football Amateur due to the professionalisation of the first two divisions in Algeria.

References

External links

Oran Province
Football clubs in Algeria
Sports clubs in Algeria